The 1997–98 Israel State Cup (Gvia HaMedina) was the 59th season of Israel's nationwide football cup competition and the 44th after the Israeli Declaration of Independence.

The competition was won by Maccabi Haifa who had beaten Hapoel Jerusalem 2–0 in the final.

By winning, Maccabi Haifa qualified to the 1998–99 UEFA Cup Winners' Cup, entering in the qualifying round.

Results

Eighth Round

Round of 16

Quarter-finals

Semi-finals

Final

References
100 Years of Football 1906–2006, Elisha Shohat (Israel), 2006, pp. 304–5
Israel Cup 1997/98 RSSSF

Israel State Cup
State Cup
Israel State Cup seasons